Cottolengo may refer to:

 Saint Giuseppe Benedetto Cottolengo
 the Society of Priests of Saint Joseph Benedict Cottolengo, S.S.C., a society of apostolic life which he founded
 the Cottolengo Friends (An Association EST. 1993), C.F AAE 1993., a society of people who believe in his ideology and service to empower the society.

See also 
 Gottolengo, a municipality in the province of Brescia